

The Anahuac Tauro is a Mexican agricultural aircraft built in small numbers in the late 1960s and 1970s. The first prototype flew on 3 December 1968, with Mexican Type certification (the first type approved by Mexico's DGAC) following on 8 August 1969. It was a low-wing braced monoplane of conventional configuration with fixed tailwheel undercarriage. The wing was of constant chord and had spray bars installed along its trailing edge.

Variants
 Tauro 300 - prototype and seven production examples with 300 hp R-755-A2M1 engine.
 Tauro 350 - four examples with 350 hp R-755-SM engine

Specifications (Tauro 350)

References

See also
Bárcenas B-01
CallAir A-9

Low-wing aircraft
Single-engined tractor aircraft
Tauro
1960s Mexican agricultural aircraft
Aircraft first flown in 1968